The striped red mullet or surmullet (Mullus surmuletus) is a species of goatfish found in the Mediterranean Sea, eastern North Atlantic Ocean, and the Black Sea. This is a commercially important species and is also sought after as a game fish.

Mullus barbatus and it are commonly called "red mullets" and often are not distinguished, though they can be told apart by the striped first dorsal fin of M. surmuletus.

Despite its English name, the striped red mullet, of the goatfish family Mullidae, is only very distantly related to the grey mullet and other species called "mullet", classified in their own separate order and family.

References

 Alan Davidson, Mediterranean Seafood, Penguin 1972,

External links

 

striped red mullet
Fish of the Mediterranean Sea
Fish of the Black Sea
Fish of Europe
Marine fauna of North Africa
striped red mullet
Taxa named by Carl Linnaeus